"Playing with Fire" is a song recorded by South Korean girl group Blackpink. It was released on November 1, 2016, together with "Stay", as the group's second digital single album titled Square Two, through YG Entertainment. The song was written by Teddy Park and composed by Park and R. Tee.

Background and release
In October 2016, a teaser image of Jennie was revealed, along with the name of one of the title tracks, "Playing With Fire", followed by teaser images of Lisa, Rosé, and Jisoo the next day. On October 31, the behind-the-scenes video for "Playing With Fire" was released.

Commercial performance
"Playing with Fire" debuted at number 3 on South Korea's Gaon Digital Chart, with 203,263 downloads (landing at number 2 on the component Download Chart) and 3,825,893 streams (debuting at number 4 on the component Streaming Chart). The following week, it fell to number 4, before reaching number 3 again in its third week. As of September 2018, the song has reached over 2,500,000 digital downloads and 100,000,000 streams in the country.

The song also debuted at number one on the Billboard World Digital Songs chart, selling over 2,000 copies in the US in its first week. It became their second number one entry on the chart. "Playing with Fire" also entered the Canadian Hot 100 at number 92, making Blackpink the first South Korean girl group and only the fifth South Korean act (after Psy, EXO, CL, and BTS) to enter the chart. In the United Kingdom, the track had reached 10.9 million streams as of 2019.

Music video and promotion

The music video for "Playing with Fire" was directed by Seo Hyun-seung, who previously worked with the group and directed the music video for "Boombayah", and it was released on Blackpink's official YouTube channel at midnight on November 1, 2016 KST. As of January 2023, the video has over 800 million views. Blackpink also released the dance practice video for "Playing With Fire" on their official YouTube channel on November 4, 2016. It was choreographed by Kyle Hanagami, who had worked with them for "Boombayah" from their previous single album Square One.

The group had their comeback stage for both songs on November 6 on SBS's Inkigayo and on Mnet's M Countdown on November 10, 2016. They received two music show wins for "Playing with Fire".

Accolades

Chart performance

Weekly charts

Monthly charts

Year-end charts

Release history

References

Blackpink songs
2016 singles
YG Entertainment singles
2016 songs
Tropical house songs
Songs written by Teddy Park